The Fish River chain of lakes is a series of five lakes in the North Maine Woods region of northern Maine, in a tributary stream to the Fish River. The lakes are an important northern Maine recreation area providing habitat for wildlife including rainbow smelt, brook trout, lake trout, and land-locked Atlantic salmon.

Long Lake
Long Lake extends southward from Saint Agatha into Maine township 17 ranges 3 and 4. Tributaries Brishlotte Brook, Ouellette Brook, and Little River flow into the north end of the lake. Paulette Brook flows into the east side of the lake; Mud Brook flows into the southeast end of the lake; and McLean Brook, Bard Brook, and Pelletier Brook flow into the southwest arm of the lake. There are two boat launch areas, a picnic area, and numerous residences and camps where Maine State Route 162 follows the west shore of the lake. Long Lake is the deepest lake of the chain, and provides good habitat for brook trout, rainbow smelt, and land-locked salmon.

Mud Lake
Numerous residences and camps line the north shore of Mud Lake along Maine State Route 162. Mud Lake is the smallest and shallowest lake of the chain, and provides habitat for longnose sucker, hornpout, and yellow perch.

Cross Lake
There are residences and camps along the north end and eastern shore of Cross Lake where Maine State Route 161 follows the northeast shore of the lake; and there is a public boat launch and picnic area on the southeast shore. The remaining shoreline of this shallow lake is boggy and undeveloped. Tributaries Dickey Brook and Daigle Brook enter the north end of the lake and Black Brook enter the south end providing spawning and nursery habitat for brook trout, rainbow smelt, and land-locked salmon.

Square Lake
Cross Lake discharges into the east side of Square Lake, and the north end of Square Lake overflows  through Eagle Lake Thoroughfare into the eastern arm of Eagle Lake. Square Lake is the largest lake of the chain and is almost entirely within Maine township 16, range 5. Tributaries Dimock Brook and California Brook flowing into the north end of the lake from township 17, range 5, and Goddard Brook flowing into the south end from township 15, range 5, provide good spawning and nursery habitat for brook trout, rainbow smelt, and land-locked salmon.

Eagle Lake

From the outlet, the lake extends southward through the eastern part of the town of Eagle Lake and forms a "L" extending eastward through township 16, range 6, into township 16, range 5. Fish River enters Eagle Lake at the bend in the "L". The chain of lakes tributary to the Fish River enters Eagle Lake via the Eagle Lake Thoroughfare from Square Lake in township 16, range 5. Smaller tributaries to Eagle Lake include Clark Brook, Gilmore Brook, Brown Brook, Devoe Brook, and Pond Brook from the town of Eagle Lake, and Alec Brook, Miller Brook, and Last Brook from township 16. The Bangor and Aroostook Railroad follows the west shore of Eagle Lake through the town of Eagle Lake and then follows the Fish River into Fort Kent. Eagle Lake provides good habitat for rainbow smelt, brook trout, lake trout, and land-locked salmon. The entire eastern arm of Eagle Lake is within the  reserve of public land available for ATV riding, birding, camping, cross-country skiing, fishing, hiking, hunting, snowmobiling, snowshoeing, and swimming.

Sources

Lakes of Aroostook County, Maine
North Maine Woods
Lakes of Maine